Florence High School may refer to:

Florence High School (Alabama), Florence, Alabama
Florence High School (Arizona), Florence, Arizona
Florence Junior/Senior High School, Florence, Colorado
Florence High School — Florence, Kansas, closed, merged with Marion High School
Florence High School (Mississippi), Florence, Mississippi
Florence High School (South Dakota) — Florence, South Dakota
Florence High School (Texas), Florence, Texas
Florence High School (Wisconsin), Florence, Wisconsin
Florence Bertell Academy of Prince George's County — Capitol Heights, Maryland
Florence Crittenton Alternative School — Lexington, Kentucky
Florence Crittenton School, Fullerton, California
Florence Township Memorial High School, Florence, New Jersey
Florence Unified School — Florence, Arizona
Florence-Carlton High School, Florence, Montana
South Florence High School, Florence, South Carolina
West Florence High School, Florence, South Carolina